Roland (Graham Field) Airport  is located  northwest of Roland, Manitoba, Canada.

References

Registered aerodromes in Manitoba